Richard Drummond McKelvey (April 27, 1944 – April 22, 2002) was a political scientist, specializing in mathematical theories of voting.  He received his BS in Mathematics from Oberlin College, MA in mathematics from Washington University in St. Louis, and PhD in political science from University of Rochester.  He was an Econometric Society fellow, and was the Edie and Lew Wasserman Professor of Political Science at the California Institute of Technology until his death, from cancer, in 2002.

McKelvey also wrote several articles about instability. One discussed the topic agenda manipulation. The McKelvey theorem indicates that almost every possible outcome can be realized through democratic decision-making, by smartly choosing the order or agenda in which decisions are taken. The desired result is established by ensuring that in each stage another composition of the majority determines the outcome of that part of the decision-making procedure. The person who designs the decision-making procedure needs to know the preferences of the participants to achieve the most desirable outcome by shifting majorities. It will be clear that the position where one can control the agenda is attractive because it is possible to implement one's choice.

In 2007 John Aldrich (Duke), James Alt (Harvard) and Arthur Lupia (Michigan) published the edited volume Positive Changes in Political Science: The Legacy of Richard D. McKelvey’s Most Influential Writings with the University of Michigan Press. The volume contains reprints of several of Richard McKelvey's classic papers along with original essays by leading names in political science.

Publications

External links
Positive Changes in Political Science press release
 
Thomas R. Palfrey, "Richard Drummond McKelvey", Biographical Memoirs of the National Academy of Sciences

American political scientists
1944 births
2002 deaths
Oberlin College alumni
Washington University in St. Louis alumni
University of Rochester alumni
Washington University in St. Louis mathematicians
California Institute of Technology faculty
Fellows of the Econometric Society
Members of the United States National Academy of Sciences
20th-century political scientists